The 2008–09 Ugandan Super League was the 42nd season of the official Ugandan football championship, the top-level football league of Uganda.

Overview
The 2008–09 Uganda Super League was contested by 18 teams and was won by Uganda Revenue Authority SC, while Mbarara United FC, Bugerere FC, Youfra FC, Sharing FC and Kakira FC were relegated.

League standings

Leading goalscorer
The top goalscorer in the 2008–09 season was Peter Ssenyonjo of Police FC with 22 goals.

Footnotes

External links
 Uganda - List of Champions - RSSSF (Hans Schöggl)
 Ugandan Football League Tables - League321.com
 Uganda Super League 2008/09 - FootballScores
 Uganda Super League 2008/09 - Futaa
 Uganda Super League 2009/10 - TablesLeague

Ugandan Super League seasons
Uganda Super League
Super League